The Davos process was the name given to the process of reconciliation, rapprochement between Greece and Turkey, conducted in 1988 between Andreas Papandreou and Turkish prime minister Turgut Özal. Their meeting took place at the annual World Economic Forum meeting in Davos, Switzerland.

References
 Mehmet Ali Birand, "Turkey and the 'Davos Process': Experiences and Prospects", The Greek-Turkish Conflict in the 1990s, pp 27–39.

History of modern Greece
Greece–Turkey relations
History of the Republic of Turkey